The 2015 World Sledge Hockey Challenge was an international ice sledge hockey tournament organized by Hockey Canada hosted in Leduc, Alberta, from February 1–7, 2015, at the Leduc Recreation Centre. The U.S. National Sled Hockey Team defeated Russia, 2-1 to win the competition.

Teams
 (8th Appearance)
 (2nd Appearance)
 (2nd Appearance)
 (8th Appearance)

Background
Canada, Russia, South Korea and the United States all return.

2015 Tournament

Preliminary round
All times are local (UTC-7).

Playoff round

Semi-finals

Bronze-medal game

Gold-medal game

Final standings

Statistics

References

External links
Hockey Canada's WSHC Website

Sledge hockey competitions
Sport in Alberta
2015 in ice hockey
2015 in Canadian sports
Ice hockey in Alberta